Gilany Hosnani (born 21 August 1957) is a Mauritian table tennis player. He competed in the men's singles and the men's doubles events at the 1988 Summer Olympics.

References

External links
 

1957 births
Living people
Mauritian male table tennis players
Olympic table tennis players of Mauritius
Table tennis players at the 1988 Summer Olympics
Mauritian people of Indian descent